Shyam Dhani is an Indian politician and a member of 17th Legislative Assembly of Uttar Pradesh of India. He represents the Kapilvastu (Assembly constituency) constituency in Siddharthnagar district of Uttar Pradesh and is a member of the Bharatiya Janata Party.

Early life and education
Dhani was born 3 July 1952 in Dhauri Kuiya village of Siddharthnagar district in Uttar Pradesh to father Ram Nath. He is unmarried till now. He belongs to Scheduled Caste (Pasi) community. He is a Graduate from Budh Vidyapeeth Mahavidyalaya  Naugarh  Siddharthnagar (Deen Dayal Upadhyay Gorakhpur University).

Political career
Dhani started his political career in 17th Legislative Assembly of Uttar Pradesh (2017) elections, he was elected MLA from Kapilvastu (Assembly constituency) as a member of Bharatiya Janata Party. He defeated Samajwadi Party candidate Vijay Kumar by a margin of 38,154 votes.

Posts held

References

Uttar Pradesh MLAs 2017–2022
Bharatiya Janata Party politicians from Uttar Pradesh
Living people
People from Siddharthnagar district
1952 births